Luděk Frydrych (born 3 January 1987 in Chlumec nad Cidlinou) is a Czech professional football goalkeeper who currently plays for Olympia Prague.

Honours
Czech Rupublic U-21
FIFA U-20 World Cup runner-up (1) 2007

References

External links

1987 births
Living people
Czech footballers
Czech First League players
FK Jablonec players
FC Hradec Králové players
Association football goalkeepers